Liss railway station is a stop on the Portsmouth Direct Line, serving the village of Liss in Hampshire, England,  down the line from  via Woking. As a small station, for most of the day there is one train each way (to Portsmouth and London) an hour. The station is managed by South Western Railway, which operates all trains serving it.

The station had a platform adjacent to the main line, which was the southern terminus of the Longmoor Military Railway. The former station goods yard connected to the LMR via Liss Junction. The footbridge was replaced on the night of 1/2 April 1967 by the ex-London, Brighton and South Coast Railway bridge from the former Cranleigh railway station.

Services
All services at Liss are operated by South Western Railway using  and  EMUs.

The typical off-peak service in trains per hour is:
 1 tph to  via 
 1 tph to 

Gallery

References

External links

Railway stations in Hampshire
DfT Category D stations
Former London and South Western Railway stations
Railway stations in Great Britain opened in 1859
Railway stations served by South Western Railway